DBFS or dBFS can refer to:

 Databricks File System, a distributed file system used for storing and querying data in Databricks
 Decibels relative to full scale, a unit of measurement for amplitude levels in digital systems which have a defined maximum peak level
 Oracle Database File System, a file system interface on top of Oracle Database tables for storage of XML files, later renamed Oracle Content Management SDK.